The 11th FINA World Junior Synchronised Swimming Championships was held July 8–13, 2010 in St. Petersburg, Russia. The synchronised swimmers are aged between 15 and 18 years old, from 26 nations, swimming in four events: Solo, Duet, Team and Free combination.

Participating nations
26 nations swam at the 2008 World Junior Championships were:

Results

References

FINA World Junior Synchronised Swimming Championships
2008 in synchronized swimming
Swimming
Jun
International aquatics competitions hosted by Russia
Synchronised swimming in Russia